Chroniques de France or Chronicles of France may refer to:

Grandes Chroniques de France - a vast compilation (13th-15th century) of material on the history of France.
Chroniques des rois de France - a compilation (c.1220-1230) of material on the history of France by an anonymous author designated "Chantilly-Vatican".

French chronicles